Fredy Sigg (1923–1998) was a Swiss designer and cartoonist. He was known nationwide for his caricatures during the 1960s to 1980s. He was active as a free-lance graphicist and illustrator from 1947. From 1958 he worked as a caricaturist for the Nebelspalter, Weltwoche and Beobachter newspapers, later also for Züri-Woche, Schweizerische Handelszeitung and Annabelle. 
Sigg married three times; Tatjana Kürschner (1948), Johanna Büchle (1953) and Edith Thalmann (1961).

References

1923 births
1998 deaths
Swiss caricaturists
Swiss cartoonists
Swiss designers